Dion Krasniqi (born 24 August 2003) is a Kosovan professional footballer who plays as a forward for Allsvenskan club Varbergs BoIS.

Club career

Early career
Krasniqi started his career at Eslövs BK, where then at the beginning of 2019, he was transferred to the youth team of Lunds BK. On 2 November 2019, he made his debut with senior team against Åtvidabergs FF after coming on as a substitute at 85th minute in place of Gustav Edén and scored his side's second goal during a 2–2 away draw.

Varbergs BoIS
On 7 July 2022, Krasniqi signed a four-and-a-half-year contract with Allsvenskan club Varbergs BoIS. His debut with Varbergs BoIS came eleven days later in a 0–0 home draw against Helsingborgs IF after coming on as a substitute at 80th minute in place of André Boman.

International career
On 15 September 2022, Krasniqi received a call-up from Kosovo U21 for a training camp held in Antalya, Turkey and for the hybrid friendly match against Greenland. His debut with Kosovo came eight days later in the hybrid friendly match against Greenland and scored his side's only goal during a 1–0 away win.

References

External links

2003 births
Living people
Kosovan men's footballers

Swedish men's footballers
Swedish people of Kosovan descent
Swedish people of Albanian descent
Association football forwards
Ettan Fotboll players
Lunds BK players
Allsvenskan players
Varbergs BoIS players